Shamil Karamagomedovich Isayev (19 March 1964 – 15 February 2019) was a Russian professional footballer.

Club career
He made his professional debut in the Soviet Second League in 1982 for FC Uralan Elista. He played 2 games in the UEFA Cup 1993–94 for FC Spartak Vladikavkaz.

Death
He died on 15 February 2019, aged 54.

Honours
 Russian Premier League champion: 1995.
 Russian Premier League runner-up: 1992.

References

1964 births
People from Urvansky District
2019 deaths
Association football midfielders
Soviet footballers
Russian footballers
FC Elista players
PFC Spartak Nalchik players
SC Tavriya Simferopol players
FC Spartak Vladikavkaz players
Russian Premier League players
Sportspeople from Kabardino-Balkaria